
Year 363 (CCCLXIII) was a common year starting on Wednesday (link will display the full calendar) of the Julian calendar. At the time, it was known as the Year of the Consulship of Iulianus and Sallustius (or, less frequently, year 1116 Ab urbe condita). The denomination 363 for this year has been used since the early medieval period, when the Anno Domini calendar era became the prevalent method in Europe for naming years.

Events 
 By place 

 Roman Empire 
 March 5 – Emperor Julian departs from Antioch with his army (90,000 men) and heads north towards the Euphrates. En route he creates a diversion and sends a force of 30,000 soldiers under his cousin Procopius to Armenia.
 April – Julian crosses the Euphrates near Hierapolis, using 50 pontoon ships, and moves eastwards to Carrhae. He destroys Perisapora and overruns Persian forts along the desert frontier (Limes Arabicus). 
 May 29 – Battle of Ctesiphon: Julian reaches the vicinity of the strongly fortified capital Ctesiphon. King Shapur II in charge of a large Persian army adopts a scorched earth policy, leaving the Romans desperately short of supplies.
 June 16 – The Roman army starts its retreat northward to Corduene (Armenia). Julian marches back up the Tigris and burns his fleet of supply ships. During the withdrawal Julian's forces suffer several attacks from the Persians.
 June 26 – Battle of Samarra: Julian is mortally wounded in a skirmish and dies from a wound received during the fighting near Samarra (Iraq). Jovian, general of the Guard, succeeds him and is proclaimed Emperor by the troops.
 Emperor Jovian negotiates a disastrous peace with Persia, surrendering four of the five Roman provinces gained by Caesar Galerius in 298, and the cities Nisibis and Singara (Mesopotamia).

 Europe 
 The Huns first appear in Europe and reach the Caspian Sea.

 Middle East 
 May 18–19 – Galilee earthquake of 363. Petra, capital of the Nabataeans (in modern-day Syria), is seriously damaged.
363 Arsakawan earthquake.  It affected the cities of Arsakawan (modern Doğubayazıt) and Salat (modern Sisian).

 By topic 

 Astronomy 
 April 20 – The planet Venus occults the planet Jupiter.

 Religion 
 The Council of Laodicea, which deals with constricting the conduct of church members, is held.  The major canon approved by this council is Canon 29, which prohibits resting on the Sabbath (Saturday), restricting Christians to honoring the Lord on Sunday.
 Mar Mattai Monastery is founded on Mount Alfaf.

Births 
 Sulpicius Severus, Christian writer (approximate date)
 Wu Di (or Liu Yu), Chinese emperor of Liu Song (d. 422)

Deaths 
 June 26 – Julian the Apostate, Roman emperor (b. 331)
 Aemilia Hilaria, Galo-Roman physician and writer (b. 300)
 Lucillianus, Roman commander (magister equitum)
 Zhang Xuanjing, Chinese ruler of Former Liang (b. 350)
 Zhou (or Cheng), Chinese concubine of Jin Chengdi

References

Sources